The Answer Man (previously titled The Dream of the Romans and Arlen Faber) is a 2009 American romantic comedy film written and directed by John Hindman and starring Jeff Daniels, Lauren Graham and Lou Taylor Pucci. The film premiered at the 2009 Sundance Film Festival. The film received negative reviews.

Plot
Reclusive author Arlen Faber wrote a best-selling spiritual book, Me and God, but rejects the celebrity it has brought him and lives anonymously in Philadelphia. He jealously guards his identity and refuses to cooperate with his publisher, who wishes him to help publicize the 20th anniversary of the book's release. However, his identity is gradually revealed to a mail carrier, bookstore owner Kris, and chiropractor Elizabeth.

Arlen is reluctantly drawn into relationships with Kris and Elizabetheach of whom has their own problems. Kris is an alcoholic who is just out of rehab and who is troubled by the impending failure of his bookstore and his father's persistent alcoholism. Elizabeth and her seven-year-old son were abandoned by her husband, causing her to be overprotective of the boy. She has moved to Philadelphia to open a chiropractic clinic and start her life anew.

A back injury causes Arlen to crawl to the clinic for help. Elizabeth fixes his back problem and the two of them begin awkwardly dating. She is reticent to become involved because of her concern for her son and having been left by her husband. He is an emotional mess, largely because of the death of his father from Alzheimer's. Despite writing a spiritual book about conversations with God, he is spiritually adrift and seeks answers to difficult questions. He charms her, but he also says inappropriate, abrasive things that almost doom the relationship.

Kris and Arlen make a deal where they trade books for answers to questions. Each day, Arlen gives books to Kris to sell and allows him to ask him a single question about spiritual matters.

Arlen's newfound relationships come to a crisis when Kris's father dies and he shows up at Arlen's house for solace while Elizabeth is there. She comforts Kris, but Arlen is emotionally blocked and unable to provide sympathy, which appalls Elizabeth.

The crisis impels Arlen to change. He arranges to have his book's new release held at Kris's bookstoreseemingly saving it from bankruptcy. At the book's release, he reveals the impact of his father's death to both Elizabeth and fans of his book. He tells them that he does not speak with God, that he had many questions after his father's death and did his best to come up with some answers. Elizabeth is touched by Arlen's revelation, but she still does not trust him and runs from the bookstore. Arlen pursues her and they have an emotional reconnection. They agree to make a new attempt at a relationship and are last seen walking down the sidewalk together.

Cast
 Jeff Daniels as Arlen Faber
 Lauren Graham as Elizabeth
 Lou Taylor Pucci as Kris Lucas
 Thomas Roy as Riley Lucas
 Olivia Thirlby as Anne
 Kat Dennings as Dahlia
 Nora Dunn as Terry Fraser
 Max Antisell as Alex
 Tony Hale as Mailman

Production
Filming, using the working title The Dream of the Romans, began on March 23, 2008, in Philadelphia, and ended in June 2008. Philadelphia native Thomas Roy plays the alcoholic father of the character played by Lou Taylor Pucci.

Reception
 
The Answer Man received negative reviews. Rotten Tomatoes gives it a score of 30%  based on 46 reviews, with an average rating of 5.06/10. The site's critics consensus reads: "The Answer Man takes an interesting premise and overloads it with implausible scenarios, indie comedy cliches, and an all-too-familiar story arc that only occasionally benefits from its typically capable actors." Metacritic reports a score of 44/100 based on 16 critic reviews, indicating "mixed or average reviews".

References

External links
 
 

2009 films
2009 directorial debut films
2009 romantic comedy films
American romantic comedy films
Films set in bookstores
Films about spirituality
Films about writers
Films scored by Teddy Castellucci
Films set in Philadelphia
Films shot in Philadelphia
2000s English-language films
2000s American films